Félix M. López, Jr. (Havana, April 1, 1954) is a Cuban-born American sports executive.

Lopez moved to Tampa, Fla., in 1969 and later graduated from Cam Tech School of Construction. 

He is the Executive Vice President/Chief International Officer for the New York Yankees. His current responsibilities include overseeing the daily operations of George M. Steinbrenner Field, the Himes Player Development Complex and the Single-A Tampa Yankees. He is also involved with the Yankees' Latin Baseball Academy in Boca Chica, Dominican Republic, as well as player development in Latin America. He also serves on the boards of Yankee Global Enterprises, LLC, and Legends Hospitality, LLC. 

Under Mr. Lopez's supervision, the Yankees spring training home in Tampa, Fla., has undergone several structural enhancements and renovations, including the expansion of field box seating and the redesign of the Yankees' clubhouse facilities. Fan-friendly amenities have been at the forefront of Mr. Lopez's operational strategy, including the design of the Brighthouse Networks Dugout Club, located underneath the field box seats behind home plate. In addition, Mr. Lopez was instrumental in developing the new Tampa Tribune Deck, which was unveiled in 2008. Located beyond the right field wall, the unique and intimate structure features picnic-style seating the 500 people, private concessions and a full bar. In January 2010, Mr. Lopez headed a Yankees delegation that took the club's 2009 World Series trophy to the Dominican Republic. The visit included stops at the Presidential Palace, U.S. Embassy, National Police Headquarters and Santo Domingo's Quisqueya Stadium for a Dominican Winter League playoff game. 

Before Joining the Yankees, Mr. Lopez was the president of Architecture Design & Construction, Inc., a company specializing in commercial construction in the Southeastern United States. 
He is a member of the Grand Lodge of Free and Accepted Masons of Florida and Nobles of the Mystic Shrine of North America. He also serves on the board of the Gold Shield Foundation and contributes to the efforts of the Police Athletic League (PAL) Mr. Lopez is married to Jessica Steinbrenner and is the son-in-law to George M. Steinbrenner III. He has three children (Felix M. Lopez III, Jessica A. Lopez, and Vanessa L. Lopez) and resides in Tampa, Fla. with his wife and family.

See also
Steinbrenner family

References
 
 New York Yankees Official 2011 Media Guide and Record Book

1954 births
Baseball executives
Living people
Steinbrenner family